The 2016 Eneco Tour is a road cycling stage race which took place between 19 and 25 September 2016 in the Netherlands and Belgium. It was the 12th edition of the Eneco Tour stage race and the twenty-sixth race of the 2016 UCI World Tour. It was won by Niki Terpstra.

Teams 

The 18 UCI World Tour teams are automatically entitled and obliged to start the race. The race organisation also gave out wildcards to four UCI Professional Continental teams.

Schedule 

The course for the race was announced in March 2016.

Stages

Stage 1 
19 September 2016 — Bolsward to Bolsward,

Stage 2 
20 September 2016 — Breda to Breda,  Individual time trial (ITT)

Stage 3 
21 September 2016 — Blankenberge to Ardooie,

Stage 4 
22 September 2016 — Aalter to Sint-Pieters-Leeuw,

Stage 5 
23 September 2016 — Sittard-Geleen to Sittard-Geleen,  Team time trial (TTT)

Stage 6 
24 September 2016 — Riemst to Lanaken,

Stage 7 
24 September 2016 — Bornem to Geraardsbergen,

Classification leadership table 

There are four principal classifications in the race. The first of these is the general classification, calculated by adding up the time each rider took to ride each stage. Time bonuses are applied for winning stages (10, 6 and 4 seconds to the first three riders) and for the three "golden kilometre" sprints on each stage. At each of these sprints, the first three riders are given 3-, 2- and 1-second bonuses respectively. The rider with the lowest cumulative time is the winner of the general classification. The rider leading the classification wins a white jersey.

There is also a points classification. On each road stage the riders are awarded points for finishing in the top 10 places, with other points awarded for intermediate sprints. The rider with the most accumulated points is the leader of the classification and wins the red jersey. The combativity classification is based solely on points won at the intermediate sprints; the leading rider wins the green jersey. The final classification is a team classification: on each stage the times of the best three riders on each team are added up. The team with the lowest cumulative time over the seven stages wins the team classification.

 In stage five, Dylan Groenewegen, who was second in the points classification, wore the red jersey, because first-placed Peter Sagan wore the white jersey as leader of the general classification.

References

External links 
 

2016
2016 UCI World Tour
2016 in Belgian sport
2016 in Dutch sport
September 2016 sports events in Europe